State Route 40 (SR 40) is a primary state highway in the southern part of the U.S. state of Virginia. It runs from SR 8 at Woolwine east to SR 10 at Spring Grove, about half the width of Virginia. It is the longest state-numbered (not U.S. or Interstate) route in Virginia.

Route description

SR 40 begins at SR 8 at the small community of Woolwine. It heads northeast along the eastern side of the Blue Ridge, crossing streams and foothills via a curving route. Around Endicott, the highway starts to turn east, away from the ridge, and straightens out as the terrain becomes flatter. Between Ferrum and Rocky Mount, SR 40 parallels the Norfolk Southern Railway's north–south Winston-Salem District. The route intersects U.S. Route 220 Business (US 220 Business) in downtown Rocky Mount and the newer US 220 bypass to the east, soon splitting from SR 122, which leads northeast to Bedford, and turning directly east. After it leaves Rocky Mount, SR 40 heads east, largely along a newer alignment that utilizes cuts and fills to provide a straight and level path. Approaching Gretna, it intersects the US 29 bypass, and then US 29 Business in downtown Gretna. This portion of the highway ends where it meets US 501 at North Halifax, turning north and crossing the Roanoke River into Brookneal.

US 501 and SR 40 split in downtown Brookneal, with US 501 heading northwest and SR 40 leaving to the northeast, but soon turning east. The highway passes through Phenix on its way to Charlotte Court House, where it intersects SR 47 with a brief overlap. Inside Keysville, SR 40 meets the north end of SR 59 and crosses US 15/360 Business, and then crosses the US 15/US 360 bypass outside the town limits. Just beyond, the short SR 385 provides access to Southside Virginia Community College. SR 40 joins SR 49 at Lunenburg, overlapping that route to downtown Victoria. From Victoria east to downtown Kenbridge, where it meets the west and north ends of SR 137 and SR 138, SR 40 parallels the abandoned Virginian Railway. The route leaves Kenbridge to the northeast, running past the north end of SR 46 to a junction with US 460 Business in downtown Blackstone.

After a short overlap with US 460 Business, SR 40 leaves to the east, while the business route continues northeast back to US 460. Because SR 40 is south of US 460 Business on both sides of the overlap, SR 40 does not intersect US 460 here. Outside the town limits, SR 40 crosses through Fort Pickett. The route crosses US 1 in McKenney and I-85 at exit 42 just to the east. After bypassing Stony Creek to the south, SR 40 crosses US 301 and I-95 at exit 31; a short State Route 40 Business follows the original route through Stony Creek, returning to SR 40 on the east end via a short overlap with US 301. Between Sussex and a point east of Homeville (where SR 40 crosses SR 35), a secondary route to the south is the former alignment, now named Old Forty Road. Beyond Homeville, the last stretch of the highway heads northeasterly, crossing US 460 in Waverly before ending at SR 10 at Spring Grove. State Route 646, a secondary highway, continues northeast beyond SR 10 to the former end of SR 40 in Claremont.

Major intersections

Special routes

Victoria Truck Route

Virginia State Truck Route 40 in Victoria, Virginia is Tidewater Avenue from Court Street to West 6th Street, and Railroad Avenue from Tidewater Avenue and West 6th Street to Main Street. Most of the route is concurrent with Virginia State Route 49 Truck

Stony Creek Business Route

State Route 40 Business is a former segment of SR 40 that was converted into a business route that runs through "downtown" Stony Creek. It runs along Lee Avenue from a realigned section of SR 40 west of the town, crosses the CSX North End Subdivision and then turns south in a multiplex with US 301 (Blue Star Memorial Highway), where it ends at SR 40 west of Exit 31 on Interstate 95. US 301 continues from here south towards Emporia, the Carolinas, Georgia, and northern and western Florida.

The former segment on the other side of I-95 is a .39 mile local dead end street named Redbank Road that is designated Virginia Secondary Route 317.

References

External links

Virginia Highways Project: VA 40

040
State Route 040
State Route 040
State Route 040
State Route 040
State Route 040
State Route 040
State Route 040
State Route 040
State Route 040
State Route 040
State Route 040
Rocky Mount, Virginia